Major-General Henry Ernest Roper  (1923 – 13 July 1982) was a British Army officer who became Assistant Chief of the General Staff.

Military career
Roper was commissioned into the Royal Corps of Signals in 1942 and fought in World War II in North West Europe and South East Asia. He was appointed Commanding Officer of 30th Signal Regiment in 1964, Assistant Military Secretary at the Ministry of Defence in 1966 and Director of Project Mallard (a scheme to develop a cellular network for the battlefield) at the Ministry of Technology in 1968. He went on to be Chief Signals Officer for the British Army of the Rhine in 1972 and Assistant Chief of the General Staff (Operational Requirements) in 1975 before retiring in 1978.

References

1923 births
1982 deaths
British Army generals
Companions of the Order of the Bath
Royal Corps of Signals officers
British Army personnel of World War II